Arthur Dean (born 23 July 1931) is an Australian former cricketer. He played five first-class cricket matches for Victoria between 1953 and 1957.

See also
 List of Victoria first-class cricketers

References

External links
 

1931 births
Living people
Australian cricketers
Victoria cricketers
Cricketers from Melbourne